The Weed Science Society of America (WSSA) is a nonprofit, learned society focused on weed science. It was founded in 1956. The organization promotes research, education, and extension outreach, provides science-based information to the public and policy makers, and fosters awareness of weeds and their impact on both managed and natural ecosystems. President for 2018-19 is Scott Senseman from the University of Tennessee.

WSSA has started the International Survey of Herbicide Resistant Weeds initiative to collect herbicide resistances. The WSSA classifies all herbicides by the mode of action.

In 2017, WSSA began a partnership with Cambridge University Press to continue publication of the three WSSA journals: Weed Science (formerly Weeds) , Weed Technology , and Invasive Plant Science and Management .

References

Learned societies of the United States
Botanical societies
Organizations established in 1956